This is a list of universities and other higher education institutions in Venezuela by size of student population, it only reflects the institutions with a source of enrollment, those with no information of the enrollment, were not shown.

See also 
 List of largest universities by enrollment
 List of universities in Venezuela

References

Venezuela
Statistics of education

Universities By Enrollment